The Farafangana mine is a large mine located in the southern part of Madagascar in Atsimo-Atsinanana. Farafangana represents one of the largest bauxite reserves in Madagascar and one of the largest in Asia, having estimated reserves of 100 million tonnes grading 37% aluminium oxide.

See also 
 Mining industry of Madagascar

References 

Bauxite mines in Madagascar